The Kahuzi horseshoe bat (Rhinolophus kahuzi) is a species of bat in the family Rhinolophidae, which is found in eastern Democratic Republic of the Congo. It is named after Mount Kahuzi.

References

Rhinolophidae
Mammals described in 2013
Bats of Africa
Mammals of the Democratic Republic of the Congo
Endemic fauna of the Democratic Republic of the Congo